Roaring Camp Bridge was a private covered bridge spanning Elk Creek about  west of Drain in the U.S. state of Oregon. Robert Lancaster built the bridge in 1929 to provide road access to his farm, and other local residents used it as well. Roaring Camp was also the name of a roadhouse near the bridge.

Roaring Camp Bridge, clad with unpainted vertical  boards, had ribbon openings along its side walls. Added to the National Register of Historic Places in 1979, it was delisted after its demolition.

See also
 List of bridges on the National Register of Historic Places in Oregon
 List of Oregon covered bridges
 National Register of Historic Places listings in Douglas County, Oregon

References

1929 establishments in Oregon
1995 disestablishments in Oregon
Bridges completed in 1929
Covered bridges on the National Register of Historic Places in Oregon
Bridges in Douglas County, Oregon
Demolished bridges in the United States
Former National Register of Historic Places in Oregon
Wooden bridges in Oregon
National Register of Historic Places in Douglas County, Oregon
Road bridges on the National Register of Historic Places in Oregon
Buildings and structures demolished in 1995